Patvi may refer to:

 Patvi, honorific title used by Yuvraj indicating that he is the Crown Prince in India. It is generally used preceding the other title like Namdar and Kunwar. For Example : Patvi Namdar or Patvi Kunwar.  
 Patvi,  surname in the Savji community of India
 Patvi, dialect of the Malvi language in the Malwa region of India